Melissa Carolina Varón Ballesteros (born Melissa Varón on February 26, 1989, in Santa Marta, Colombia) is a model and beauty queen pageant first runner-up of the Miss Colombia 2011 and formally representative of Colombia Miss International 2012.

Early life
Melissa studied Chemical Engineering at the National University of Colombia in Medellin and has toured many parts of Colombia due to her profession. Melissa is fluent in English. She is the daughter of Marcos Varón Rodriguez (†) and Aidee Armenta Ballesteros, and her sister is Nataly Varón.

Pageantry

Miss Colombia 2011
In the 2011–2012 Miss Colombia pageant edition, Melissa won the Miss Elegance Primatela. She later began to be considered as a favorite for the crown along with the representatives from the departments of Valle and Atlántico. On the night of the 14 of November in Cartagena She received the second best score (9.50) at the evening gown gala giving her the right to follow onto the swimsuit phase where she was named first runner-up. The response proved to be safe and direct earning her public confidence and the jury gave her the title of National Beauty Virreina of Colombia 2011–2012, and curiously, last year Lizeth González of Magdalena (the same department Melissa represented) achieved this very same position.

Miss International 2012
Melissa represented Colombia at the Miss International 2012 in Okinawa, Japan where she placed among the 15 semi-finalists.

References

Living people
1987 births
Miss International 2012 delegates